St. Francois Township is the name of four townships in the U.S. state of Missouri:

St. Francois Township, Butler County, Missouri
St. Francois Township, Madison County, Missouri
St. Francois Township, Saint Francois County, Missouri
St. Francois Township, Wayne County, Missouri

See also
Saint-François (disambiguation)

Missouri township disambiguation pages